Platanthera grandiflora, the greater purple fringed orchid, is a species of orchid, genus Platanthera, occurring from Ontario to Newfoundland, south along the Appalachian Mountains to northeastern Georgia, with an isolated population in Illinois.  It is imperiled in Georgia, Tennessee, Virginia and North Carolina and presumed extirpated in Ohio.

References

grandiflora
Orchids of Canada
Orchids of the United States
Plants described in 1824